Ogwyn is both a given name and a surname. Notable people with the name include:

Ogwyn Davies (1925–2015), Welsh artist
Joby Ogwyn (born 1974), American mountain climber, BASE jumper, and wingsuit flyer